Mar Thoma College of Special Education, Badiadka, Beejanthadka, Perdala is a college affiliated to Kerala University of Health Sciences located at Badiyadka in Kasaragod District in India.

Courses offered
 Bachelor of Audiology & Speech Language Pathology (BASLP) 
 Master of Audiology and Speech Language Pathology (MASLP)

References

 http://www.kuhs.ac.in

Badiyadka
Colleges in Kasaragod district